Hill Street may refer to

 Hill Street, London
 Hill Street (Los Angeles)
 Hill Street, Singapore
 Hill Street Blues, a television series